The 2021 Fastlane was the sixth and final Fastlane professional wrestling pay-per-view (PPV) and livestreaming event produced by WWE. It was held for wrestlers from the promotion's Raw and SmackDown brand divisions. The event took place on March 21, 2021, from the WWE ThunderDome, hosted at Tropicana Field in St. Petersburg, Florida. It was WWE's final pay-per-view presented from Tropicana Field during the COVID-19 pandemic as the ThunderDome was relocated to the Yuengling Center in Tampa, Florida due to the start of the 2021 Tampa Bay Rays season. It was the first Fastlane event held since 2019. It was also WWE's first pay-per-view event to air on Peacock in the United States, and the last to be available on the standalone version of the American WWE Network before its shutdown on April 4.

Eight matches were contested at the event, including one on the Kickoff pre-show. In the main event, Roman Reigns defeated Daniel Bryan to retain the Universal Championship with Edge as the special guest enforcer. In other prominent matches, Drew McIntyre defeated Sheamus in a No Holds Barred match, Seth Rollins defeated Shinsuke Nakamura, Big E defeated Apollo Crews to retain the Intercontinental Championship, and Alexa Bliss defeated Randy Orton in an intergender match thanks to the return of "The Fiend" Bray Wyatt following a three-month storyline absence.

Production

Background
Fastlane was a pay-per-view (PPV) and WWE Network event first produced by WWE in 2015. The name of the event is a reference to its position on the "Road to WrestleMania", being held in the two-month period between the Royal Rumble and WWE's flagship event; the first two Fastlane events were held in February before moving to March. The event was held annually until 2020 when Fastlane was removed from the schedule to allow WWE to hold that year's Super ShowDown pay-per-view, but Fastlane was reinstated in 2021. The sixth event in the Fastlane chronology, it was held on March 21, 2021 and featured wrestlers from the Raw and SmackDown brand divisions.

On January 25, 2021, WWE announced that the WWE Network would become exclusively distributed by Peacock in the United States as part of a new agreement with NBCUniversal, which airs Monday Night Raw and NXT on the USA Network. On March 18, the WWE Network became a premium channel under Peacock, with premium subscribers to the service receiving access to the WWE Network at no additional cost. As a result, Fastlane was the first pay-per-view to air on Peacock's WWE Network channel. After a brief transitional period, the standalone version of the WWE Network in the U.S. shut down on April 4, with future events only available via Peacock's WWE Network channel and traditional PPV, which in turn also made Fastlane the very last in-ring event to air on the standalone version of the American WWE Network before its shutdown. This did not affect other countries, which maintain the separate WWE Network service distributed by WWE.

Impact of the COVID-19 pandemic

As a result of the COVID-19 pandemic that began affecting the industry in mid-March 2020, WWE had to present the majority of its programming from a behind closed doors set. Initially, Raw and SmackDown's television shows and PPVs were done at the WWE Performance Center in Orlando, Florida. A limited number of Performance Center trainees and friends and family members of the wrestlers were later utilized to serve as the live audience. In late August, these programs were moved to a bio-secure bubble called the WWE ThunderDome. The select live audience was no longer utilized as the bubble allowed fans to attend the events virtually for free and be seen on the nearly 1,000 LED boards within the arena. Additionally, the ThunderDome utilized various special effects to further enhance wrestlers' entrances, and arena audio was mixed with that of the chants from the virtual fans. After being hosted at Orlando's Amway Center, the ThunderDome was relocated to Tropicana Field in St. Petersburg, Florida in December.

Due to the start of the 2021 Tampa Bay Rays season, as Tropicana Field is the home venue of the Tampa Bay Rays, on March 24, 2021, WWE announced that they would relocate the ThunderDome to the Yuengling Center, located on the campus of the University of South Florida in Tampa, beginning with the April 12 episode of Raw. Fastlane was in turn the final WWE pay-per-view produced from the ThunderDome at Tropicana Field.

Storylines
The event comprised eight matches, including one on the Kickoff pre-show, that resulted from scripted storylines, where wrestlers portrayed heroes, villains, or less distinguishable characters in scripted events that built tension and culminated in a wrestling match or series of matches. Results were predetermined by WWE's writers on the Raw and SmackDown brands, while storylines were produced on WWE's weekly television shows, Monday Night Raw and Friday Night SmackDown.

At Elimination Chamber, Daniel Bryan won SmackDown's Elimination Chamber match, which earned him an immediate Universal Championship match against Roman Reigns, who quickly defeated Bryan to retain the title. Following the match, men's Royal Rumble winner Edge appeared and performed a Spear on Reigns, indicating his choice to challenge Reigns for the Universal Championship at WrestleMania 37. On the following SmackDown, Reigns, accompanied by his special counsel Paul Heyman and cousin Jey Uso, claimed that Edge ruined his win over Bryan, who interrupted. Bryan mocked Reigns for defending his championship against him right after he had won the Elimination Chamber match, and was confused as to why Reigns wanted to defend the title in the second match of the event instead of in the main event. Bryan then challenged Reigns to another championship match at Fastlane. Jey interjected and stated that Bryan lost and would have to earn another opportunity like everyone else and then challenged Bryan to a match. Backstage, Edge confronted WWE official Adam Pearce and took issue that Bryan may receive a title shot before him, even though he had won the Royal Rumble match that Bryan also competed in. Pearce decided that Bryan would only get a Universal Championship match at Fastlane if he could defeat Jey in their match that night. In the main event, however, Bryan and Jey's match ended in a double countout. A rematch the following week was contested in a Steel Cage match where if Bryan won, he would receive the title match, but if Jey won, Bryan would have to acknowledge Reigns as the Tribal Chief and Head of the Table; Bryan defeated Jey to earn the Universal Championship match against Reigns at Fastlane. After the official contract signing for the match on the March 12 episode, a match between Edge and Jey was scheduled for the following week to determine who would be the special guest enforcer during the championship match, which was won by Edge.

After failing to defeat Big E for the Intercontinental Championship in January, Apollo Crews turned heel and began to embrace his royal Nigerian roots, including speaking with a Nigerian accent. On the February 19 episode of SmackDown, after Crews' loss against Shinsuke Nakamura where Big E was on commentary, Crews attacked Nakamura after the match. Big E aided Nakamura, however, Crews attacked Big E with the steel steps, taking him out of action for a couple of weeks. Big E returned on the March 12 episode and called out Crews, who did not answer. Big E then issued an open challenge for the Intercontinental Championship where he retained the title against Sami Zayn. After the match, Crews blindsided Big E and attacked him with the steel steps once again. Big E was subsequently scheduled to defend the Intercontinental Championship against Crews at Fastlane.

On the February 1 episode of Raw, Sheamus turned on his friend Drew McIntyre, declaring that he was not his friend anymore and wanted the WWE Championship. Later that same night, McIntyre accepted Sheamus' challenge for a one-on-one match. McIntyre was then scheduled to defend the title in Raw's Elimination Chamber match at Elimination Chamber in which Sheamus was also a participant; McIntyre retained the championship but then lost it to The Miz, who cashed in his Money in the Bank contract after McIntyre was attacked by Bobby Lashley. McIntyre returned on the March 1 episode of Raw, where he finally faced Sheamus in their promised one-on-one match that McIntyre won. A rematch the following week was contested as a No Disqualification match; however, it ended by referee stoppage. Another match between the two was scheduled for Fastlane as a No Holds Barred match.

At TLC: Tables, Ladders & Chairs in December 2020, Randy Orton defeated "The Fiend" Bray Wyatt in a Firefly Inferno match. After the match, Orton doused The Fiend's lifeless body in gasoline and set him on fire. Following this incident, Alexa Bliss, who had aligned with The Fiend months earlier, began to haunt Orton on a weekly basis, including causing him to lose multiple matches. On the March 15 episode of Raw, Bliss challenged Orton to an intergender match at Fastlane, and Orton accepted in the hopes of ridding Bliss from his life.

Incensed at being left out of Raw's Elimination Chamber match, Braun Strowman took issue with WWE officials Shane McMahon and Adam Pearce. In an attempt to rectify things, Shane scheduled Strowman to team with Pearce to face The Hurt Business (Cedric Alexander and Shelton Benjamin) for the Raw Tag Team Championship. Strowman had the match won, however, after performing a Running Powerslam on Benjamin, Shane signaled to Pearce to tag in for the pin only for Benjamin to perform a roll up on Pearce to retain the title, which enraged Strowman further. Shane then began to insult Strowman's intelligence. Strowman then challenged Shane to a match on the March 15 episode of Raw. The match, however, never officially started and the two instead brawled with Shane calling Strowman stupid. This led to a match being scheduled between the two at Fastlane.

At Elimination Chamber, Riddle won the United States Championship. On the March 1 episode of Raw, Retribution's Mustafa Ali defeated Riddle in a non-title match. Ali then received a United States Championship match against Riddle on the March 15 episode where Riddle retained. Following the show, Ali posted a video on Twitter challenging Riddle to another title match, which was scheduled for the Fastlane Kickoff pre-show.

At Elimination Chamber, Shayna Baszler and Nia Jax defeated SmackDown Women's Champion Sasha Banks and Bianca Belair to retain the WWE Women's Tag Team Championship. On the March 5 episode of SmackDown, a rematch between the two teams was scheduled for Fastlane.

On the March 19 episode of SmackDown, while Seth Rollins was talking about Cesaro being the biggest waste of talent in WWE, Shinsuke Nakamura appeared and laid out Rollins. A match between Rollins and Nakamura was subsequently scheduled for Fastlane.

Event

Pre-show
During the Fastlane Kickoff pre-show, Riddle defended the United States Championship against Mustafa Ali (accompanied by his Retribution stablemates T-Bar, Mace, Slapjack, and Reckoning). In the end, Riddle performed a Bro-Derek on Ali from the top rope to retain the title. Following the match, Ali yelled at Reckoning and Slapjack, causing them to walk out on him, after which, Mace and T-Bar attacked Ali with a double Chokeslam.

Preliminary matches
The actual pay-per-view opened with Nia Jax and Shayna Baszler (accompanied by Reginald) defending the WWE Women's Tag Team Championship against SmackDown Women's Champion Sasha Banks and Bianca Belair. In the climax, as Banks applied the Bank Statement on Baszler, Belair attacked Jax to prevent Jax from breaking the submission, however, Jax shoved Belair onto Banks, voiding the submission. As Banks was arguing with Belair, Baszler took advantage and performed a roll-up on a distracted Banks to retain the titles. Following the match, Banks blamed Belair for their loss and slapped Belair before departing backstage.

Following the match, the commentators spoke about the scheduled match between Shane McMahon and Braun Strowman, after which, footage was shown from earlier in the day that Shane injured his leg during his training. After the footage, Shane came out of the trainer's room wielding a crutch and with his knee wrapped up. Elias and Jaxson Ryker then approached Shane about doing a concert at WrestleMania. Shane then stated that he has an idea.

Next, Big E defended the Intercontinental Championship against Apollo Crews. Big E reversed a pin attempt by Crews into his own pin attempt to retain the title. Following the match, Crews attacked Big E.

Backstage for an Old Spice advertisement, Akira Tozawa was in search of 24/7 Champion R-Truth, who was hiding in the Old Spice display. Old Spice representative Joseph Average (portrayed by NXT and WWE Performance Center trainee Erik Bugez) then accidentally pinned R-Truth to win the championship after the shelf of deodorants fell over. R-Truth then performed a roll-up on Average to win back the title for his record 51st 24/7 Championship.

After that, Shane McMahon came out to the ring and introduced Elias (accompanied by Jaxson Ryker). Shane allowed Elias to preview his WrestleMania concert, however, after Elias began playing his guitar, Shane cut him off and announced that Elias would be taking his place in his scheduled match against Braun Strowman, who then made his entrance. Strowman performed a Running Powerslam on Elias to win the match.

In the following match, Seth Rollins faced Shinsuke Nakamura. In the climax, Rollins performed a Black Magic Kick and a Curb Stomp on Nakamura to win the match.

After this, Drew McIntyre faced Sheamus in a No Holds Barred match. McIntyre performed a Future Shock DDT on Sheamus onto a television monitor before performing the Claymore Kick to win the match.

In the penultimate match, Randy Orton faced Alexa Bliss in an intergender match. Before the match started, Orton began to spit up a black liquid. During the match, Bliss used supernatural powers, such as causing a lighting rig to fall which nearly landed on Orton and shooting a fireball at Orton. In the end, "The Fiend" Bray Wyatt—who had not been seen since Orton set him on fire at TLC: Tables, Ladders & Chairs in December 2020—tore through the ring canvas, appearing very grotesque with charred skin. Bliss, who was perched atop the turnbuckle, pushed Orton into The Fiend, who then attacked Orton with a Sister Abigail, allowing Bliss to pin Orton to win the match.

Main event
In the main event, Roman Reigns (accompanied by Paul Heyman) defended the Universal Championship against Daniel Bryan with Edge as the special guest enforcer. In the climax, Bryan accidentally incapacitated the referee, after which, Reigns performed a Spear on Bryan, which prompted Edge to take over as the official. While Bryan applied the Yes! Lock on Reigns, Jey Uso entered the ring and performed a superkick on Edge and Bryan, after which, Jey retrieved a steel chair. As Jey attempted to attack Bryan, Bryan countered and attacked Jey with the chair. Bryan tried to attack Reigns with the chair, however, Reigns ducked and Bryan accidentally struck Edge. As Bryan then applied the Yes! Lock on Reigns once again, Reigns visibly tapped out, however, there was no referee to notice and in response, an enraged Edge attacked both Bryan and Reigns with the steel chair before departing backstage. A second referee came down and Reigns pinned Bryan to retain the title.

Aftermath

Raw
On the following night's episode of Raw, Randy Orton attempted to summon "The Fiend" Bray Wyatt after what had transpired at Fastlane. Alexa Bliss appeared on the stage holding a jack-in-a-box signaling the return of The Fiend, after which, the lights went out. When they returned, The Fiend was standing in the ring. Orton performed an RKO on The Fiend, after which, Bliss walked to the ring to taunt Orton. The Fiend then rose to his feet and attacked Orton with a Sister Abigail. Bliss then pointed to the WrestleMania sign and a match between The Fiend and Orton was scheduled for WrestleMania 37.

Also on Raw, Shane McMahon, along with Elias and Jaxson Ryker, continued to taunt Braun Strowman, who came out and defeated Elias in a rematch. Shane then attacked Strowman with his crutch, revealing that Shane had feigned his injury. Shane then retreated and Strowman challenged Shane to a match at WrestleMania 37 and Shane accepted. The following week, Strowman chose a Steel Cage match as the stipulation.

SmackDown
On the March 26 episode of SmackDown, Adam Pearce announced that Roman Reigns would defend the Universal Championship against both Edge and Daniel Bryan in a triple threat match at WrestleMania 37. The following week, Bryan faced Jey Uso in a street fight, where Bryan was victorious. After the match, Bryan rammed Edge into the ring post before applying the Yes! Lock on Reigns to stand tall. On the WrestleMania edition of SmackDown, Reigns, Edge, and Bryan gave their final WrestleMania messages, while Jey Uso won the André the Giant Memorial Battle Royal. At WrestleMania 37, Reigns defeated Edge and Bryan to retain the Universal Championship.

Also on SmackDown, Apollo Crews pinned Big E in a six-man tag team match. A rematch between the two for the Intercontinental Championship was subsequently scheduled for WrestleMania 37, which was later changed to a Nigerian Drum Fight. At the event, Crews defeated Big E to win the title after interference from a large man, later revealed to be Commander Azeez.

Seth Rollins faced and defeated Shinsuke Nakamura in a rematch on the following SmackDown. Afterwards, Rollins was attacked by Cesaro, leading to a match between Rollins and Cesaro at WrestleMania 37, which Cesaro won.

Future
In October 2021, WWE revealed their PPV calendar for 2022, and Fastlane was not included. While there had been a to be announced event for February, on January 17, 2022, this event was revealed as Elimination Chamber. Fastlane was in turn discontinued without a formal announcement.

Results

Notes

References

External links
 
 

2021
2021 WWE Network events
2021 WWE pay-per-view events
2021 in professional wrestling in Florida
Events in St. Petersburg, Florida
Impact of the COVID-19 pandemic on television
March 2021 events in the United States
Professional wrestling in St. Petersburg, Florida